Sunset Glacier is a glacier in the Alaska Range of Denali National Park and Preserve in the U.S. state of Alaska. The glacier originates near Scott Peak, moving southwest, then northwest. Sunrise Glacier is nearby.

See also
 List of glaciers

References

External links
 Hiking in the area of Sunrise and Sunset Glaciers at the National Park Service

Glaciers of Denali Borough, Alaska
Glaciers of Denali National Park and Preserve
Glaciers of Alaska